This is a list of sportspeople from Dynamo sports society. Most of them are World Champions or Olympic medalists.

Artistic gymnastics
Athletes, who competed in artistic gymnastics:
Ludmilla Tourischeva
Alexander Dityatin
Sofia Muratova
Natalia Shaposhnikova
Aleksandr Tkachyov
Mikhail Voronin
Viktoria Komova
Maria Paseka

Athletics
Athletes, who competed in the sport of athletics:
Aleksandr Aksinin
Yevgeniy Arzhanov
Mykola Avilov
Mikhail Bariban
Aleksandr Baryshnikov
Natalya Bochina
Valeriy Borzov
Lyudmila Bragina
Olga Bryzgina
Viktor Bryzgin
Aleksandra Chudina
Nina Dumbadze
Yevgeniy Gavrilenko
Valentin Gavrilov
Vladimir Goryaev
Nadezhda Ilyina
Inese Jaunzeme
Bruno Junk
Vladimir Kazantsev
Vasiliy Khmelevskiy
Nadezhda Khnykina-Dvalishvili
Aleksandr Kornelyuk
Valentina Kozyr
Olena Krasovska
Viktor Kravchenko
Vitold Kreyer
Vladimir Krylov
Viktor Myasnikov
Irina Nazarova
Uno Palu
Irina Press
Vasily Rudenkov
Viktor Saneyev
Robert Shavlakadze
Leonid Shcherbakov
Natalya Sokolova
Vladimir Sukharev
Kęstutis Šapka
Tatyana Talysheva
Romas Ubartas
Grigoriy Yegorov
Sergei Zhelanov

Basketball
Athletes, who competed in basketball:
Aleksandr Boloshev
Nodar Dzhordzhikiya
Mikheil Korkia
Otar Korkia
Tatiana Ovechkina
Yuri Ozerov
Zurab Sakandelidze
Viktor Vlasov

Biathlon
Athletes, who competed in biathlon:
Vladimir Barnashov
Anfisa Reztsova
Aleksandr Tikhonov

Boxing
Athletes, who competed in boxing:
Anatoli Bulakov
Viktor Demyanenko
Viktor Miroshnichenko
Valeri Popenchenko
Nurmagomed Shanavazov
Valerian Sokolov
Vyacheslav Yanovskiy

Canoeing
Athletes, who competed in canoeing:
Uladzimir Parfianovich
Viktor Reneysky

Cross-country skiing
Athletes, who competed in cross-country skiing:
Oleksandr Batyuk
Yevgeny Belyayev
Alevtina Kolchina
Pavel Kolchin
Vladimir Kuzin
Antonina Ordina
Anfisa Reztsova
Vasily (Pavlovich) Rochev
Vasily (Vasilyevich) Rochev, (son of the above)
Fyodor Simashev
Yuliya Chepalova
Vyacheslav Vedenin

Cycling
Athletes, who competed in cycling:
Artūras Kasputis
Gintautas Umaras
Laima Zilporytė

Fencing

Athletes, who competed in fencing:
Vadym Gutzeit
Alexandr Romankov
Yakov Rylsky
Igor Tikhomirov
Iosif Vitebskiy

Figure skating
Athletes, who competed in figure skating:
Aleksandr Gorshkov
Gennadi Karponossov
Natalia Linichuk
Lyudmila Pakhomova

Football
Athletes, who competed in football:
Oleg Blokhin
Igor Dobrovolski
Murtaz Khurtsilava
Lev Yashin

Handball
Athletes, who competed in handball:
Vyacheslav Atavin

Ice hockey
Athletes, who competed in ice hockey:
Helmuts Balderis
Zinetula Bilyaletdinov
Aleksandr Maltsev
Vasili Pervukhin
Valeri Vasiliev

Parachuting
Jutta Irmscher

Speed skating
Athletes, who competed in speed skating:
Inga Artamonova
Viktor Kosichkin
Rimma Zhukova

Swimming
Athletes, who competed in swimming:
Igor Polyansky

Tennis
Athletes, who competed in tennis:
Alex Metreveli

Weightlifting
Athletes, who competed in weightlifting:
Oksen Mirzoian
Anatoly Pisarenko
Yury Zakharevich

Wrestling
Athletes who competed in wrestling:
Sergei Beloglazov

See also
Dynamo sports society

References